The Union of Nationalists, also known as the Union of Nationally Minded, was a political alliance in Greece in the 1940s.

History
The alliance was formed prior to the 1946 elections by an alliance of the Nationalist Party and the People's Agrarian Party. It received 2.9% of the vote, winning nine seats in the Hellenic Parliament.

The alliance did not contest any further elections.

References

Defunct political party alliances in Greece